Nextcentury is a studio album by electronic musician Vektroid under the alias Peace Forever Eternal. The album was released on May 24, 2017 on Vektroid's Bandcamp page. Vektroid used her Twitter and Instagram pages to promote the album's release. The album's description on Bandcamp states "Volume 1", hinting there may be a sequel to the album. Nextcentury has good reviews from critics.

Track listing

References

2017 albums
Vektroid albums